The 155 GH 52 APU (which stands for 155 mm gun-howitzer, 52 calibers, auxiliary power unit), Finnish designation 155 K 98 (155 mm kenttäkanuuna 1998 or "155 mm field gun 1998"; FDF terminology doesn't recognise gun-howitzers), is a Finnish towed artillery piece developed in 1998. It is largely based on the 155 K 83 with some major enhancements. It can be moved on the field short distances with its own auxiliary diesel engine, which is used in all 56 units used by the Finnish defence forces, is a 78-kilowatt Deutz diesel engine. The Egyptian units are not equipped with the APU.

The 155 GH 52 is considered to be one of the most modern field artillery cannons to date and was originally manufactured by Oy Tampella AB industries (today a part of Patria, Patria Vammas Systems Oy). It has a high rate of fire (6 rounds per minute) and can fire all types of 155 mm ammunition.

Domestic operators
The Kainuu Artillery Regiment of Kainuu Brigade in Vuosanka shooting range and the Artillery Brigade in Niinisalo in Pohjankangas shooting range operate the guns in Finland. The artillery units train also at Rovajärvi shooting range in Rovaniemi, Lapland.

In Finnish practice one infantry readiness brigade has one organic artillery regiment consisting of two artillery fire battalions. Both of the artillery fire battalions have 18 cannons divided in three six cannon batteries, which means that an artillery regiment, which is an organic unit for a readiness brigade, should have 36 cannons in its two artillery battalions. Finland has three readiness brigades.

Export
In 2003 a gun was mounted on a Soviet T-55 chassis for use as a self-propelled gun prototype. This vehicle was designed primarily as a design study for the Egyptian Army. It was later sold to Egypt, but no deal of more units were made.

On 21 May 2007, the Finnish Yleisradio revealed some problems with the 155 GH 52 APU, dealing with reliability issues of the towing system and barrel behavior when firing long-distance rounds. These facts had been withheld from the Egyptians at the time of the deal. The major challenges have been the accuracy of fire in the longest distances and barrel wear with same distances.

The arms deal lead into a juridical process formally presented as an allegation of corruption. Inspector Janne Järvinen and state prosecutor Ari-Pekka Koivisto investigated if the 10% trade commission had been partly allocated to the directors of the buying organisation using the commercial agent.

Characteristics
The gun's deployment power is 78 kW and its driven speed (in terrain, to location) is 7.5 km/h or 15 km/h when pulled by a heavy truck. The cost of one system is 500,000 euros.

After having encountered problems with firing at 35 km - 40 km, the Finnish Army concentrated its artillery gun development on the M270 Multiple Launch Rocket System (in Finnish arsenal 298 RsRakH 06, later 298 RSRAKH 06) bought as Dutch surplus.

Operators

Current operators
 -  at least 16 units, variant 155 GH 52 without the APU.
 - 56 units.

See also
 List of artillery
 122 K 60
 155 K 83
 130 K 90-60
 Soltam M-68
 Soltam M-71

References

External links 

 155 K 98 (in Finnish)

Tampella
Field artillery
155 mm artillery
155 K 98
Military equipment introduced in the 1990s